Grindley railway station was a former British railway station to serve the village of  Grindley in Staffordshire.

It was opened by the Stafford and Uttoxeter Railway in 1867 and closed in 1939. The Stafford and Uttoxeter Railway was purchased for £100,000 by the Great Northern Railway in July 1881 and the line subsequently passed into LNER ownership with Railway Grouping in 1923.

Originally single line, a passing loop was added in 1887. Built in a cutting, the main station buildings were next to the road above, with the booking office on the main platform. Like most of the others on the line, the platforms were staggered, both accessible by cart tracks.

Two miles further north the single line entered Bromshall Tunnel before reaching its junction with North Staffordshire Railway line to Uttoxeter.

References

Further reading

Disused railway stations in Staffordshire
Former Great Northern Railway stations
Railway stations in Great Britain opened in 1867
Railway stations in Great Britain closed in 1939